Mervyn Patrick Wingfield, 9th Viscount Powerscourt (22 August 1905 – 1973), was an Irish peer.

He was the son of The 8th Viscount Powerscourt and Sybil Pleydell-Bouverie. He married Sheila Claude Beddington on 16 December 1932 in Jerusalem. They had three children, a daughter and two sons, Grania Langrishe, the heir 10th Viscount Powerscourt Mervyn Niall Wingfield ((1935-2015) son (the heir 11th Viscount Powerscourt)) Mervyn Anthony Wingfield 1963-) and Guy Wingfield.

The Second World War had a huge impact on the family. The then Mervyn Patrick Wingfield (he succeeded as The 9th Viscount Powerscourt in March 1947) served in the war and was captured by the Germans in Italy. When he came home his health had been compromised and he suffered from shell shock. His wife Sheila (known as Lady Powerscourt from March 1947) had taken the family to Bermuda. They returned home when he did. He came into his inheritance of the Powerscourt Estate in March 1947, when he became Lord Powerscourt. His marriage never recovered from the impact of the war. In 1963, his wife left and, as a result of the financial impact, the family sold the Powerscourt Estate.

He was appointed the first Chief Scout of the Boy Scouts of Ireland (BSI) in 1949.

He was an uncle of the mother of Sarah, Duchess of York.

References

Viscounts in the Peerage of Ireland
1905 births
1973 deaths